Rouchovany is a municipality and village in Třebíč District in the Vysočina Region of the Czech Republic. It has about 1,200 inhabitants.

Administrative parts
The village of Šemíkovice is an administrative part of Rouchovany.

Economy
Part of the Dukovany Nuclear Power Station lies in the municipal territory.

References

Villages in Třebíč District